Bagoóng is a Philippine condiment partially or completely made of either fermented fish (bagoóng) or krill or shrimp paste (alamáng) with salt. The fermentation process also produces fish sauce known as patís.

The preparation of bagoóng can vary regionally in the Philippines.

Types
Bagoóng is usually made from a variety of fish species, including the following:

Anchovies - known as dilis, monamon, bolinaw, or gurayan (Stolephrus and Encrasicholina species)
Round scads - known as galunggóng or tamodios (Decapterus species)
Bonnetmouths (redbait or rubyfish) - known as terong (Emmelichthys nitidus, Emmelichthys struhsakeri, and Plagiogeneion rubiginosum)	
Ponyfish - known as sapsáp (Leiognathus, Photopectoralis, and Equulites species)
Rabbitfish - known as padas (Siganus species)
Bar-eyed gobies - known as ipon (Glossogobius giuris)
Herrings - known as lila (Clupeoides)
Silver perch - known as ayungin (Leiopotherapon plumbeus)

Bagoóng made from fish is encompassed by the term bagoóng isdâ (lit. "fish bagoong") in Luzon and northern parts of the Visayas. They can be distinguished further by the type of fish they are made of. Those made from anchovies are generally known as bagoong monamon or bagoong dilis and those from bonnetmouths as bagoong terong. 

In the southern Visayas and Mindanao, fish bagoong made from anchovies is known as guinamos (also spelled ginamos). Larger fermented fish are known as tinabal.

Bagoong can also be made from krill. This type of bagoong is known as bagoong alamang. It is called uyap or alamang in the southern Philippines, aramang in Ilocos and parts of Northern Luzon, and ginamos or dayok in western Visayas.

In rarer instances, it can also be made from oysters, clams, and fish and shrimp roe. A kind of bagoong made in the town of Balayan, Batangas is also known as bagoong Balayan.

Preparation

Bagoong isda and bagoong alamang
Bagoong isda is prepared by mixing salt and fish usually by volume; mixture proportions are proprietary depending on the manufacturer. The salt and fish are mixed uniformly, usually by hand. The mixture is kept inside large earthen fermentation jars (known as tapayan in Tagalog and Visayan languages, and burnay in Ilocano). It is covered, to keep flies away, and left to ferment for 30–90 days with occasional stirring to make sure the salt is spread evenly. The mixture can expand significantly during the process.

The preparation of bagoong alamang (shrimp or krill paste) is similar, with krill cleaned thoroughly and washed in weak brine solution (10%). As in fish bagoong, the shrimp are then mixed with salt in a 25% salt to 75% shrimp ratio by weight.

The products of the fermentation process are usually pale gray to white in color. To obtain the characteristic red or pink color of some bagoong, a kind of food coloring known as angkak is added. Angkak is made from rice inoculated with a species of red mold (Monascus purpureus). High-quality salt with little mineral impurities is preferred. High metallic content in the salt used can often result in darker colors to the resulting bagoong and a less agreeable undertaste. Likewise, oversalting and undersalting also has a significant impact on the rate and quality of fermentation due to their effects on the bacteria involved in the process. Some manufacturers grind the fermented product finely and sell the resulting mixture as fish paste.

Patís

Patís or fish sauce is a byproduct of the fermentation process. It is a clear, yellowish liquid that floats above the fermented mixture, and has a sharp salty or cheese-like flavor. Sauces similar to patís include nước mắm in Vietnam, nam pha (ນ້ຳປາ) in Laos, hom ha in China, nam pla in Thailand, shottsuru in Japan and saeu chot in Korea, as well as the garum of ancient Greece and the Roman empire. Indonesia has an East Javanese condiment called petis (pronounced similar to patís in Filipino): a paste made from the caramelized fermented reduction of pindang broth, a spicy and tangy herbal soup typically containing fish or shrimp (occasionally, beef or eggs).

To obtain patís, fermentation is longer, usually taking six months to a year. During the longer fermentation processes, the fish or shrimp constituents disintegrate further, producing a clear yellowish liquid on top of the mixture due to hydrolysis. This is the patis; it can be harvested once it has developed its characteristic smell. It is drained, pasteurized, and bottled separately, while the residue is turned into bagoong. If the residual solids are not moist enough, brine is usually added. The rate of fermentation can vary depending on the pH levels of the mixture and the temperature. Exposure to sunlight can also reduce the amount of time required to two months.

Reputation 
Over the centuries, western unfamiliarity with bagoong has given it a reputation as an "exotic" dish, portrayed in a positive or negative light depending on the point of view of the writer. For example, one early description was Spanish colonial official Antonio de Morga, whose book Sucesos de las Islas Filipinas (Events in the Philippine Isles) included a description of bagoong as "fish which ... has started to rot and stink." This later prompted preeminent Philippine nationalist Jose Rizal to denounce the descriptions in his 1890 annotation, saying:

See also

Bagoong fried rice
Balao-balao
Binagoongan
Burong isda
Dayok
List of fermented foods
List of fish sauces
Taba ng talangka
Palapa

References

 Bagoong: Good for the brain
 Filipino American, Fred Cordova, Filipinos: Forgotten Asian Americans (Dubuque, IA: Kendall/ Hunt, 1983)
 Philippines Deep Sea Fishing and Refrigeration
 Foods Used by Filipinos in Hawaii, Bulletin 98 - Hawaii Agricultural Experiment Station, 1946

Anchovy dishes
Fermented fish
Fish sauces
Philippine condiments